In Droves is the second studio album by alternative metal band Black Map, released on March 10, 2017.

Track listing
Charts

Run Rabbit Run. Mainstream rock #31

References 

2017 albums